Widad Olympic Boufarik, formerly Widad Adabi Boufarik, shortly WO Boufarik, is a basketball team belonging to a multi-sports club of the same name. Based in Boufarik, Algeria, WA Boufarik has historically been the nation's second-best team, after GS Pétroliers. In total, WA Boufarik has won 16 titles. The team won its first title in the 1987 Cup of Algeria, winning the finals against NA Hussein Dey by one point (65–64). In the 1990s, the club won 12 titles, including five consecutive titles from 1990 to 1994 and four Algerian Cups. The club won its most recent league title during the 2001–02 season. In 2007, Widad played their last final against DRB Staouéli and lost 66–64.

Trophies

National competitions
Algerian Basketball Championship
Champions (9): 1990, 1991, 1992, 1993, 1994, 1997, 1998, 1999, 2002
Algerian Cup
Champions (7): 1987, 1992, 1994, 1996, 1998, 2001, 2001

International competitions
Arab Club Championship
Runners-up (1): 1998

Statistics

Season by season

References

External links
Team profile at Eurobasket.com

Basketball teams in Algeria
Basketball teams established in 1945
1945 establishments in Algeria